The 2019–20 Youngstown State Penguins men's basketball team represented Youngstown State University in the 2019–20 NCAA Division I men's basketball season. The Penguins, led by third-year head coach Jerrod Calhoun, played their home games at the Beeghly Center in Youngstown, Ohio as members of the Horizon League. They finished the season 18–15, 10–8 in Horizon League play to finish in a tie for fourth place. They defeated Milwaukee in the first round of the Horizon League tournament before losing in the quarterfinals to UIC. They accepted and invitation to the CollegeIndsider.com Tournament. However, the CIT, and all other postseason tournaments, were cancelled amid the COVID-19 pandemic.

Previous season
The Penguins finished the 2018–19 season 12–20 overall, 8–10 in Horizon League play, to finish in a four-way tie for sixth place. In the Horizon League tournament, they were defeated by Oakland in the quarterfinals.

Roster

Schedule and results

|-
!colspan=12 style=| Virgin Islands Tour

|-
!colspan=12 style=| Non-conference regular season

|-
!colspan=9 style=| Horizon League regular season

|-
!colspan=12 style=| Horizon League tournament
|-

|-
!colspan=12 style=| CIT
|-

|-

Source

References

Youngstown State Penguins men's basketball seasons
Youngstown State Penguins
Youngstown State Penguins men's basketball
Youngstown State Penguins men's basketball